Gezinchu (Gezin-Çu)  is a rural locality (a selo) in Vedensky District, Chechnya.

Administrative and municipal status 
Municipally, Gezinchu is incorporated into Kurchalinskoye rural settlement. It is one of the six settlements included in it.

Geography 

Gezinchu is located on the border between Vedensky District and Kurchaloyevsky District.

The nearest settlements to Gezinchu are Enikali in the north-west, Khashki-Mokhk in the north-east, Bas-Gordali in the south-east, and Shirdi-Mokhk in the south-west.

History 
In 1944, after the genocide and deportation of the Chechen and Ingush people and the Chechen-Ingush ASSR was abolished, the village of Gezinchu was renamed, and settled by people from the neighboring republic of Dagestan. From 1944 to 1958, it was a part of the Vedensky District of the Dagestan ASSR.

In 1958, after the Vaynakh people returned and the Chechen-Ingush ASSR was restored, the village regained its old Chechen name, Gezinchu.

Population 
 1990 Census: 125
 2002 Census: 136
 2010 Census: 73
 2019 estimate: 140

According to the 2010 Census, the majority of residents of Gezinchu were ethnic Chechens.

References 

Rural localities in Vedensky District